The Molenbeek-Ter Erpenbeek or in popular language Molenbeek (English: Millbrook-Ter Erpenbrook) is a brook in the Denderstreek, Belgium. The stream has a length of approximately 25 kilometers. The source of the Molenbeek is in Godveerdegem and the delta is located at Hofstade. This brook is not to be confused with another Molenbeek which also flows through Erpe-Mere (and Herzele).

Basin
The basin of the Molenbeek is located in the province of East Flanders and flows through the municipalities of Zottegem (Godveerdegem, Erwetegem, and Grotenberge), Herzele (Herzele, Sint-Lievens-Esse, Woubrechtegem, and Ressegem), Haaltert (Heldergem, Kerksken, and Haaltert), Erpe-Mere (Aaigem, Mere, and Erpe) and Aalst (Aalst and Hofstade).

The Molenbeek is part of the Molenbeek Erpe-Mere drainage basin, which is itself part of the Dender basin. The basin of the Molenbeek has an area of approximately 5474 hectares. The Molenbeek flows into the Dender at Hofstade.

From its source in Godveerdegem to the delta in Hofstade, the Molenbeek has the following tributaries: Plankebeek, Meilegembeek, De Burg's Heerendijkbeek, Grep, Holbeek, Steenbeek, and Zijpbeek.

Landmarks
 Due to the geography of the area, there are eight water mills in Erpe-Mere on the Molenbeek, of which six are protected by law. One of mills which was not protected has been converted into a house.
 On the Koudenberg, one of the highest hills of the community, there is a windmill that is protected by law. It was re-mounted on its base in 2006 after being restored in 2004 by a studio in Roeselare. The Kruiskoutermolen was restored in 2006 and is operational. It can be visited by appointment with the tourist service.
 There is also a water tower in Erpe in the basin of de Molenbeek.

External links
 Map drainage basin: Molenbeek Erpe-Mere

Aalst, Belgium
Erpe-Mere
Haaltert
Herzele
Zottegem
Rivers of East Flanders
Rivers of Belgium